Bobyr is a surname. Notable people with the surname include:

Andriy Matviyevych Bobyr (1915–1994), Ukrainian artist
Nikolai Pavlovich Bobyr (1854–1920), Russian general

See also
 

Ukrainian-language surnames